was a seaplane carrier of the Imperial Japanese Navy during World War II. The ship was built at Kawasaki Shipbuilding at Kobe, Japan, and was completed in February 1939.

Design and description
Mizuho was built to a similar design as the seaplane carrier , but with slightly less powerful diesel engines instead of Chitoses turbines.  She carried 24 seaplanes, and was equipped to carry twelve miniature submarines, although she could not carry full loads of both at one time.

Service history
Mizuho participated in invasion support for much of her career; her first mission was with the Fourth Surprise Attack Force.

Sinking

She capsized and sank at 04:16 hours on 2 May 1942 with the loss of 101 lives. There were 472 survivors, of which 31 were wounded.

Footnotes

External links
Tech info on acepilots.com

Ships built by Kawasaki Heavy Industries
1938 ships
World War II aircraft carriers of Japan
Ships sunk by American submarines
Seaplane tenders of the Imperial Japanese Navy
Maritime incidents in May 1942
World War II shipwrecks in the Pacific Ocean